Nua is a small town located in Jhunjhunu district, in the state of Rajasthan, India.

The most common major religions are Hinduism and Islam.Gurjar ruler Mohan ji gurjar made nua fort in 1700 and defeat muslim ruler. He and his descendents  ruled in this village almost 200 years.Parmar rajputs descendants of raja bhoj of malwa and Muslim Rajputs known as Kayamkhani caste live here.

There is one hospital with initial emergency service, established 1970.

It has a railway station established in 1926 and is served by six daily trains, and was one of the locales where the 2011 Hindi comedy film Chalo Dilli was shot and 2020 web series Bard Of Blood Season 1 was also shot here .

There are three government schools in which two are girls school and one is convent (established in 1940) up to 12th standard with every stream i.e. Science, Commerce and Arts, one private girls college, Ramadevi Mahila P.G. College, established in 2007 with every stream.

References

Villages in Jhunjhunu district